The Tampa Theatre is a historic U.S. theater and city landmark in Downtown Tampa, Florida. Designed as an atmospheric theatre-style movie palace by architect John Eberson, it opened on October 15, 1926.

The theatre features a wide range of independent, foreign, and documentary films. It is Tampa's only non-profit movie palace, and operating costs are supported by its members, donors, and corporate sponsors, as well as by ticket and concessions sales. It has often been used as a backdrop for movies, music videos, and local programming.

History

Tampa Theatre was the first commercial building in Tampa to offer air conditioning. The theatre's interior resembles a romantic Mediterranean courtyard replete with old-world statuary, flowers, and gargoyles. On the ceiling is an artificial nighttime sky with stars on it.

By the 1960s and 70s, many American movie palaces were demolished because the land beneath them became more valuable than the theatre operation. 

In 1973, the theatre faced the same fate. But the citizens rallied and committees were formed. City leaders became involved, and soon a deal was reached to have the City rescue the Tampa Theatre by assuming its leases. The Arts Council of Hillsborough County agreed to program and manage the Tampa Theatre with films, concerts, and special events. By the time the Theatre reopened in early 1978, the Tampa Theatre had become something of a national model on how to save an endangered theater.

In 1992, restoration efforts were led by the Tampa Theatre Foundation after the building caught fire in 1991. The theatre presents and hosts over 600 events a year including a full schedule of the first run and classic films, concerts, special events, corporate events, tours, and educational programs.

Since its rescue in 1978, the theatre has welcomed over five million guests including over one million school children for school field trips and summer camps in the context of one of Tampa's largest historic preservation projects.

It was named to the National Register of Historic Places in 1978, is a Tampa City Landmark, and is a member of the League of Historic American Theatres.

The theatre has undergone many restoration projects as well as equipment upgrades. The most recent restoration project was the replacement of the marquee which includes the vertical blade sign and the canopy.  The completion was marked by the Marquee Lighting Ceremony which took place on January 16, 2004.

The theatre operates The Mighty Wurlitzer Theatre Organ and the instrument is played before nightly films. The organ is played and maintained by a team of volunteer organists from the Central Florida Theatre Organ Society.

In the spring of 2013, during its 86th year of existence, efforts began to convert to digital picture and sound (with the exception of productions that are only available in the movie reel format) and screened a free showing of Samsara to celebrate the transition. The switch to digital occurred at a cost of $150,000.

In late 2017, the Theatre closed for six weeks to complete the first phase of its long-term restoration plan, a $6 million renovation that updated the electrical systems, re-seated the auditorium with seats designed to match the original look from 1926, added a new and expanded concessions stand and bar, installed a new emergency power system, and protected the building from storms by installing new storm rated windows and doors on the Florida Avenue side of the building. The seating capacity was reduced from 1,446 to 1,238 to improve comfort and legroom. A new carpet, designed to match the original 1926 design, was installed, as well as a new grand drape and valance for the proscenium arch 
also designed to match the original.

The lobby paint and plaster were restored to their original palette by crews from EverGreene Studios, in New York, including the replication of four tapestries to replace the faded and worn tapestries from 1926. The original tapestries were transferred to the Tampa Bay History Center for preservation.

In popular culture
The glam metal band Sleeze Beez filmed the music video for the song "Stranger Than Paradise" at the theater.

Noted performers

 Gregg Allman Band
 Tori Amos (3 times)
 Blondie
 Lindsey Buckingham
 David Byrne
 Colbie Caillat
 Ray Charles
 Harry Chapin
 Chris Cornell
 Miranda Cosgrove
 Elvis Costello
 Jamie Cullum
 Ani DiFranco
 Dr. John
 The Dresden Dolls
 Drive-By Truckers
 Steve Earle
 Jimmy Fallon
 Genesis
 Gov't Mule (3 times)
 Arlo Guthrie
 Buddy Guy
 Emmylou Harris
 Iron Butterfly
 Joe Jackson
 Albert King
 B.B. King (9 times)
 Kris Kristofferson
 Ray LaMontagne
 Amos Lee
 John Legend
 Gordon Lightfoot
 Darlene Love
 Love and Rockets
 Shelby Lynne
 Aimee Mann
 Dave Mason
 Matisyahu
 Jessica Lea Mayfield
 Delbert McClinton
 Pat Metheny Group
 Randy Newman
 Nickel Creek
 Night Ranger (3 times)
 New Order
 Old Crow Medicine Show
 The Police
 Iggy Pop
 Postmodern Jukebox
 Psychedelic Furs
 Queensrÿche
 Ramones
 Damien Rice
 Todd Rundgren
 Leon Russell
 Joe Satriani
 Boz Scaggs
 Sister Hazel
 Phoebe Snow
 Spyro Gyra
 Tegan and Sara
 Third Eye Blind
 George Thorogood
 Wilco
 "Weird Al" Yankovic
 Warren Zevon
 Andrew Dice Clay

Gallery

References

External links
 
 Maps and Aerial Photos on Google Maps
 360° Virtual Tour of the Tampa Theatre from TBO.com
 Tampa Theatre at flheritage.com
 
 

Cinemas and movie theaters in Florida
National Register of Historic Places in Tampa, Florida
Movie palaces
John Eberson buildings
Music venues in Florida
Theatres in Tampa, Florida
Theatres on the National Register of Historic Places in Florida
Historic American Buildings Survey in Florida
Atmospheric theatres
1926 establishments in Florida
Nonprofit cinemas and movie theaters in the United States
Public venues with a theatre organ